Fumo is a surname. Notable people named such include:

 Bartolommeo Fumo, Italian Dominican theologian
 Carlos Fumo Gonçalves, Mozambican footballer
 John Fumo, American instrumental musician
 Vincent Fumo, former PA State Senator and Federal convict

See also
 FUMO, a mobile phone standard
 Touhou Project, of which a notable line of high-quality plush figures called "fumos" depict many of the series' characters